Danacea is a genus of beetles belonging to the family Melyridae.

List of species
 Danacea acutangula Schilsky, 1897
 Danacea aenea Morawitz, 1861
 Danacea albanica Apfelbeck, 1911
 Danacea amabilis J. Sahlberg, 1903
 Danacea ambigua Mulsant & Rey, 1868
 Danacea angulata (Küster, 1850)
 Danacea atripes Graëlls, 1858
 Danacea aurichalcea (Küster, 1850)
 Danacea barrosi Pic, 1907
 Danacea baudii Schilsky, 1897
 Danacea bleusei Pic, 1895
 Danacea bosnica Pic, 1913
 Danacea bourgeoisi Zürcher, 1911
 Danacea brevipennis Pic, 1932
 Danacea bucciarellii Liberti, 1979
 Danacea bulgarica Pic, 1902
 Danacea caneparii Liberti, 1985
 Danacea caprariae Liberti, 1985
 Danacea cervina (Küster, 1850)
 Danacea championi Marseul, 1878
 Danacea clavipes Schilsky, 1897
 Danacea coiffaiti Constantin, 1990
 Danacea concii Liberti, 1984
 Danacea confinis Schilsky, 1987
 Danacea consimilis Schilsky, 1897
 Danacea constantini Liberti, 1985
 Danacea corsica Kiesenwetter, 1871
 Danacea cretica Kiesenwetter, 1859
 Danacea cusanensis (Costa, 1847)
 Danacea cylindricollis Schilsky, 1897
 Danacea cypria Schilsky, 1897
 Danacea dauci Liberti, 1894
 Danacea delphini Liberti, 1894
 Danacea denticollis Baudi, 1861
 Danacea denticulata Pic, 1903
 Danacea distincta (Lucas, 1849)
 Danacea elongatipennis Pic, 1917
 Danacea eludens Liberti & Schembri, 2002
 Danacea femoralis Schilsky, 1907
 Danacea fuscoaenea Fairmaire, 1880
 Danacea ganglbaueri Prochazka, 1894
 Danacea hispanica Gougelet, 1859
 Danacea hypoleuca Kiesenwetter, 1859
 Danacea ilicis Liberti, 1985
 Danacea imperialis (Gené, 1836)
 Danacea iners Kiesenwetter, 1859
 Danacea insularis Schilsky, 1897
 Danacea intermedia Apfelbeck, 1911
 Danacea jonica Liberti, 1985
 Danacea kiesenwetteri Heyden, 1870
 Danacea korbi Schilsky, 1897
 Danacea krueperi Schilsky, 1897
 Danacea lata Kiesenwetter, 1867
 Danacea latipennis Pic, 1903
 Danacea leonardii Liberti, 1979
 Danacea ligurica Liberti, 1984
 Danacea limbata Schilsky, 1897
 Danacea longiceps Mulsant & Rey, 1868
 Danacea lucana Liberti, 1989
 Danacea luigionii Pic, 1920
 Danacea lusitana Heyden, 1870
 Danacea luteipalpis Schilsky, 1907
 Danacea luteopubens Pic, 1922
 Danacea lysholmi Pic, 1900
 Danacea maculicornis Pic, 1914
 Danacea major Pic, 1902
 Danacea marginata (Küster, 1851)
 Danacea martini Pic, 1904
 Danacea micans Prochazka, 1894
 Danacea milleri Schilsky, 1897
 Danacea minuta Pic, 1894
 Danacea mitis (Küster, 1850)
 Danacea monastirensis Pic, 1917
 Danacea montivaga Mulsant & Rey, 1868
 Danacea moreana Pic, 1905
 Danacea morosa Kiesenwetter, 1863
 Danacea murina (Küster, 1850)
 Danacea mutata Pic, 1895
 Danacea nana Kiesenwetter, 1863
 Danacea neglecta Schilsky, 1897
 Danacea nigripalpis Fiori, 1912
 Danacea nigritarsis (Küster, 1850)
 Danacea nympha Liberti, 1985
 Danacea obscura Schilsky, 1897
 Danacea oertzeni Schilsky, 1897
 Danacea olivacea Baudi, 1873
 Danacea olympiaca Schilsky, 1897
 Danacea opulenta Schilsky, 1897
 Danacea oreas Liberti, 1985
 Danacea pallidipalpis Abeille de Perrin, 1894
 Danacea pallipes (Panzer, 1793)
 Danacea parnassia Schilsky, 1897
 Danacea particeps Mulsant & Rey, 1868
 Danacea pici Bleuse, 1896
 Danacea picicornis (Küster, 1850)
 Danacea poggii Liberti, 1895
 Danacea posterecta Pic, 1902
 Danacea purkynei Obenberger, 1917
 Danacea pygmaea Schaufuss, 1869
 Danacea rambouseki Roubal, 1909
 Danacea retowskii Reitter, 1890
 Danacea romana Pic, 1902
 Danacea rostrata Prochazka, 1894
 Danacea sardoa Kiesenwetter, 1871
 Danacea scyllea Liberti, 1981
 Danacea serbica Kiesenwetter, 1863
 Danacea shardaghensis Apfelbeck, 1918
 Danacea sicana Liberti, 1985
 Danacea sicula Pic, 1895
 Danacea sulcitana Liberti, 1985
 Danacea syrensis Pic, 1910
 Danacea taurica Baudi, 1873
 Danacea taygetana Pic, 1902
 Danacea temporalis Schilsky, 1897
 Danacea thessalonicensis Apfelbeck, 1911
 Danacea thymi Liberti & Schembri, 2002
 Danacea trinacriae Liberti, 1979
 Danacea valonensis Apfelbeck, 1911
 Danacea vitticollis Schilsky, 1897
 Danacea winneguthi Apfelbeck, 1911
 Danacea wittmeri Liberti, 1985
 Danacea ziczac Schaufuss, 1869

References
 Biolib

Melyridae
Cleroidea genera